Sky Valley is a census-designated place in Riverside County, California. The 2010 United States census reported Sky Valley's population was 2,406.

Geography
According to the United States Census Bureau, the CDP covers an area of 24.3 square miles (62.9 km), all of it land.

Demographics
At the 2010 census Sky Valley had a population of 2,406. The racial makeup of Sky Valley was 1,961 (81.5%) White, 35 (1.5%) African American, 34 (1.4%) Native American, 21 (0.9%) Asian, 3 (0.1%) Pacific Islander, 282 (11.7%) from other races, and 70 (2.9%) from two or more races. Hispanic or Latino of any race were 682 people (28.3%).

The census reported that 2,397 people (99.6% of the population) lived in households, 9 (0.4%) lived in non-institutionalized group quarters, and no one was institutionalized.

There were 1,064 households, 183 (17.2%) had children under the age of 18 living in them, 521 (49.0%) were opposite-sex married couples living together, 64 (6.0%) had a female householder with no husband present, 47 (4.4%) had a male householder with no wife present.  There were 44 (4.1%) unmarried opposite-sex partnerships, and 25 (2.3%) same-sex married couples or partnerships. 345 households (32.4%) were one person and 171 (16.1%) had someone living alone who was 65 or older. The average household size was 2.25.  There were 632 families (59.4% of households); the average family size was 2.80.

The age distribution was 368 people (15.3%) under the age of 18, 134 people (5.6%) aged 18 to 24, 389 people (16.2%) aged 25 to 44, 779 people (32.4%) aged 45 to 64, and 736 people (30.6%) who were 65 or older.  The median age was 53.5 years. For every 100 females, there were 114.6 males.  For every 100 females age 18 and over, there were 111.6 males.

There were 1,766 housing units at an average density of 72.8 per square mile, of the occupied units 854 (80.3%) were owner-occupied and 210 (19.7%) were rented. The homeowner vacancy rate was 5.0%; the rental vacancy rate was 23.2%.  1,886 people (78.4% of the population) lived in owner-occupied housing units and 511 people (21.2%) lived in rental housing units.

Cultural references
Seminal desert rock band Kyuss released the highly acclaimed album Welcome to Sky Valley in 1994. The album's cover artwork features a photo of a welcome sign located outside of the town, which has since become an attraction for fans of the band.

References

Census-designated places in Riverside County, California
Census-designated places in California
Coachella Valley